Ohseuchi Dam  is an asphalt dam located in Miyazaki Prefecture in Japan. The dam is used for power production. The catchment area of the dam is 1.7 km2. The dam impounds about 27  ha of land when full and can store 6200 thousand cubic meters of water. The construction of the dam was started on 1997 and completed in 2007.

See also
List of dams in Japan

References

Dams in Miyazaki Prefecture